Wyman Bradbury Seavy Moor (November 11, 1811March 10, 1869) was an American politician and lawyer from the U.S. state of Maine. His political career, interspersed with periods in private law practice, began with his service in the Maine House of Representatives, and continued when he became Maine Attorney General. Moor married Clara Ann Niel Cook (b. 1813 in Waterville, Maine) in 1834. She was a descendant of Thomas Dudley, one of the Governors of Massachusetts Bay Colony.

Moor was appointed as a Democrat to the U.S. Senate to fill the vacancy caused by the death of John Fairfield. In later years he was the superintendent of a railroad construction project in Maine and was appointed by President James Buchanan as consul-general to British North America (i.e. Canada). After he left this position he retired from public life and relocated to Lynchburg, Virginia, where he had purchased an estate and became involved in an iron furnace operation and lived out his remaining years.

Moor was born in Waterville in Kennebec County. During his political career he lived in Bangor, Maine.

External links
 

1811 births
1869 deaths
People from Waterville, Maine
Politicians from Bangor, Maine
Maine Democrats
Colby College alumni
Maine Attorneys General
Democratic Party United States senators from Maine
19th-century American politicians